Aksarka (Nenets: Хоя’-Сале, Hojaꜧ-Sale) is a rural locality (a selo) and the administrative center of Priuralsky District of Yamalo-Nenets Autonomous Okrug, Russia. Population:

References

Notes

Sources

Rural localities in Yamalo-Nenets Autonomous Okrug
Road-inaccessible communities of Russia